Demetrius "Pee Wee" Smith (born January 3, 1968) is a former kick returner and wide receiver with the Calgary Stampeders of the Canadian Football League from 1990–1996, but did not play a single game in the 1996 CFL season due to an injury.

College career
From 1988-1989, Smith played wide receiver with the Miami Hurricanes football team.

External links
ProFootballArchives page
JustSportsStats page
CFLapedia page
Sports-Reference.com College Football page
"Former Calgary Stampeder wants to comfort homeless" Globe and Mail article

1968 births
Living people
People from Compton, California
African-American players of Canadian football
Canadian football return specialists
Canadian football wide receivers
Miami Hurricanes football players
Calgary Stampeders players
21st-century African-American people
20th-century African-American sportspeople